Nazar   is an Indian supernatural and thriller series produced by 4 Lions Films and directed by Atif Khan, which airs on StarPlus and streams digitally on Disney+ Hotstar.

Season 1 of the franchise aired from 30 July 2018 to 18 February 2020. It starred Monalisa, Niyati Fatnani, and Harsh Rajput and performed well in TRP charts apart from gaining popularity.

Season 2 of the franchise, which replaced Season 1, premiered on 19 February 2020 and starred Monalisa and Shruti Sharma. Despite having good ratings, the second season of Nazar went off-air due to the pandemic situation of COVID-19 and its high production demand.

A Telefilm Of Nazar premiered on Star Plus on 10 October 2021 under the name Ankahee Dastaan - Nazar.

Seasons

Plot

Season 1

The story begins from the year 2000 where Mohana Rathod, a 251-year-old daayan, sustains her parasitic existence by draining the life-force from her victims. Living on a tree in a village, she enchants businessman Mridul Rathod and marries him.They have children, Ansh and Kajal. As Mohana helps her husband amass great wealth through black magic, she gradually drains his vitality, that eventually leads to his premature death. Mridul Rathod's sister-in-law Vedashree Rathod gets worried and seeks help from her friend Divya Sharma, who is a psychic wizardess and a reevaavanshi (member of a clan of monster-hunters) who wards off the evil eye by slashing Mohana's plait, rendering Mohana powerless. Once cornered, Divya seals Mohana in a temple protected by Mantras. Soon after, Divya goes missing.

Vedashree and her husband Shekhar Rathod adopt Ansh and Kajal.

18 years later
Ansh and Kajal grow up with their cousins, Neha and Rishi in Mumbai. Ansh discovers his superpowers, but is unaware that he is a daavansh, the hybrid offspring of a daayan/daanav and a human. He can be saved from turning to the dark side only by a girl who has Durga's trishula symbol as her birthmark, and is referred to as daivik (divine conduit). Divya's daughter Piya Sharma, has the symbol behind her neck. Away from her parents in a very young age, Piya comes to Mumbai in search of her missing mother. Spark flies between Ansh and Piya. Piya finds her father, Nishant Sharma who happens to be her college professor. Mohana sends a puppet daayan, Ruby, with a fake daivik symbol to marry Ansh, so she can return. Ansh and Vedashree fall under Ruby's control, during which Ruby and Ansh are married. Mohana is released from the seal and regains her powers. Mohana returns to Ansh and he learns about his real mother.

Piya's childhood friend and obsessive lover, Naman, attempts to marry her by taking advantage of his unwell mother, and Piya's guardian, a visually-impaired priestess, but Ansh stops the wedding. Fearing Ansh's budding romance with Piya, Mohana sends a message summoning Ruby's father, Bhaisasur, an asura from Paataal Lohk to scare away Piya. Bhaisasur attacks Ansh instead of Piya, much to Mohana's horror. A distressed Piya invokes Devi-Maa for help. She enters into a religious dance and kills Bhaisasur with her trident. Everyone learns that Piya is the real divine being. Nishant realises that Piya is his daughter. Ansh learns about his half-demon self and that Mohana and Vedeshree are sisters who had the same mother but different fathers.

Piya's sister, Saavi is hypnotised by Mohana and releases Dilruba, a chudel, to separate Piya and Ansh. Dilruba casts a raakhchakra, (hex) to capture Piya and Ansh, but Piya saves Ansh and finds herself trapped inside Dilruba's hex. Ansh fools Dilruba due to which her hex breaks, freeing Piya. Mohana agrees to Ansh and Piya's marriage and frees Divya, who is later revealed to be a Sarpika (serpent). Connecting the dots, Divya realises Mohana's intentions. Mohana kills Divya but Divya outsmarts Mohana by transferring her serpentine powers to Piya. Ansh and Piya are married.

Piya learns Mohana's real motive of wanting to feed on Ansh on the day of blood moon night: to become immortal. The churel Dilruba makes Piya fall into an eternal sleep. With Piya gone, Ansh turns to the dark side and becomes an extremely powerful Daavansh who cares for no one but himself. He Tried to married Dilruba•But Mohana did not accept the marriage and make Piya return•Piya returns with the help of trinetra-mani, a gem powered by Shiva's third eye and brings Ansh back to his senses. Piya exposes Mohana's intentions to the Rathods, after which Ansh expels Mohana. Later, Piya and Ansh consummate their marriage.

Dola, Mohana's twin sister and Ruby's mother, the 
dukayan (two−headed witch) who rules the Swapna-Lohk (Dream World) unleashes horror and threatens to kill Ansh. The Rathods manage to kill Dola, but she is revived by Mohana. The sisters fool Piya into transferring her serpentine powers to Ansh. Believing that Piya is devoid of powers, the sisters try to burn her alive using Tharal-agni a Daayan fuel. Piya invokes Devi-Maa for help and her daivik powers return. Mohana and Dola are turned into stone statues, but are freed by Ruby. A Sarp (snake-man) hypnotises Ansh and steals his Sarpika powers. He disguises himself as Ansh and targets Piya's Trinetra-mani gem. Ansh and Piya combine their powers and defeat the Sarp. Mohana feeds on the serpent disguised as Ansh during the muhurta of the blood moon night and becomes a Sarpayan possessing combined powers.

Dola sees Mohana's horoscope, which predicts that Ansh's child will put an end to her. The Rathods celebrate Piya's pregnancy. Ansh learns about Mohana's intentions to kill Piya and their unborn child. Realising the danger he poses, Ansh heavy-heartedly separates from Piya until the baby is born. After six months, Piya gives birth to a baby boy in an abandoned Shiva temple. Mohana tries to kill the child several times, but fails.

Six months later
Piya and Ansh are overwhelmed to see the superpowers of their son, Aditya Rathod. Mohana has still not given up her mission of killing Aditya. She kidnaps him and pushes him off a cliff, but Aditya is saved by Ansh. Aditya smites Mohana dead with a trident. The Rathod family discard her ashes in a river.

Vedashree starts becoming evil and more evil becomes fond of heavy jewellery and things that a daayan appreciates. Piya grows suspicious about Vedashree's changed behaviour and finds out that she has become a daayan. Vedashree successfully converts Piya into a daayan, but the daayan's power cannot overpower the divine powers within her. Piya succeeds in convincing Vedashree about the kindness within her. Vedashree removes her daayan plait and throws it into the same river where Mohana's ashes were thrown before. Mohana acquires a mermaid's body and returns for revenge when she reacquires her plait. Mohana tricks Piya into becoming a mermaid so that she can return. However, Mohana is threatened to be taken back to Kohra-Lohk, the graveyard of all evil powers and realises that only a Daivik can save her. Mohana helps Piya regain her human form under the condition that Piya must help her in return. Shalaka, the queen of Kohra-Lohk poisons the Rathods and upon realising her mistake, she gives the Kohrayan dagger to Ansh which has the power to push a person back to their past life. Ansh stabs his family and himself sending everyone back to the past. Rathods travels two years back in time. Ansh touches Piya's earring and remembers everything. He finds Piya, makes her remember the past and the two reconcile. The Rathod family reach Pravesh Dwar. They jump through it, and return to the present.

Two years later 

The Rathod family return to the present. Naman becomes a better person and trains himself to become a Revavanshi. He marries Sanam who becomes Dilruba. Ansh discovers he has a twin brother, Karan who was thrown in Patal Ketki by Mohana, thinking he is going to die but instead the Patal Ketki runs in his veins instead of blood but is now handicapped but possess magical powers. Karan, manipulated by Mohana, assumes that it was Divya who made his wife, Maansi and their child, Krish into stone statues, comes back to take revenge on Divya's family. Karan convinces Rathods to help him save his wife and child without revealing that Piya and Adi will turn to stone, while Piya is suspicious about Karan since she knew that Divya can never attack innocent people. Nishant and Ansh learn Karan's motives but they couldn't save Piya and Adi. Karan reveals his magical wings and knocks out Ansh. Maansi and Krish are freed from their stone form but it is revealed that Maansi is a daayan and a puppet of Mohana; Mohana had sent Maansi to obtain Karan's magical wings. Ansh and Karan team up and attack Mohana and Maansi. Karan makes a tough decision to turn Maansi, Krish and himself into stone in order to save Piya and Adi, leaving Ansh heartbroken, but before leaving, Karan transfers his magical wings to Ansh.

The family celebrates Adi's first birthday. Mohana turns Vedashree into her puppet, to get her things done. Vedashree tries to tarnish Piya's image in front of Rathods, especially Ansh. Piya accidentally throws Vedashree off the terrace, who gets hospitalised while Mohana transfers Vedashree's life into a "Praan-Pyala" and threatens Piya to leave the Rathods forever by breaking Ansh's heart. Piya acts cold towards Ansh and leaves the House without Adi. Nishant and Saavi follow Mohana and find that the Praan-Pyala is hidden in a daayan-island floating in the sky. Mohana demands Piya to leave the city; she agrees on the condition that she needs her son along with her. Mohana agrees and helps her to get Adi but intentionally leaves Piya's earring in Ansh's room to mislead him. An enraged Ansh goes to Nishant's office to get Adi back, however he learns that Piya is innocent. Ansh and Piya reach the Daayan island but Mohana flees from the place with Vedashree's Praan pyala. Piya gives a part of her life to Vedashree to save her, but starts to lose her strength. Nishant brings his sister-Trishila, a Revavanshi, who has the power to give life to the dead. Trishila promises the family to save Piya, and succeeds, while Ansh is suspicious about Trishila's intentions. Ansh finds out that Trishila is here for some other purpose and eventually finds out that she has come back to bring Piya's mother, Divya back to life so that Divya can forever put an end to evil powers.

Divya creates a sword named Pralay-Talvar. Divya and Mohana hear a disembodied voice which reveals that once the Pralay-Talvar is released, the Pralay-Yuddh / war between divine powers representing Divya and Evil powers representing Mohana will begin. The one whose blood flows first will be defeated and the entire clan of theirs will get destroyed. Rathods learn about the war and tries to stop it. Ansh and Piya tries to destroy the sword but in vain. Divya, sacrifices her life by stabbing herself with the Sword to save a poisoned Ansh and to kick start the war. The Pralay-Yuddh starts with all the supernatural evil entities at one side and all the Revavanshis, Rathods and Ansh on the other side. To value her mother's sacrifice, Piya transforms into the MahaKali Avtaar and destroys the evil forces and vows to destroy the world. Mohana flees, while all other evil entities gets burned to death. After Piya comes to her senses, she regrets not supporting Divya and realises that Divya was right and her actions were for the benefit of the coming generation. Piya burns Divya's pyre and she and Ansh sacrifice their powers to stay away from evil and live a normal life. They diminish Adi's powers. However, Piya is still able to use her powers and harms Adi by mistake, angering Ansh and believes that Piya did not sacrifice her powers purposefully. Piya gets tired of justifying herself and Ansh's accusations and leaves the house. Piya realizes that she is pregnant again, and that her powers are those of her unborn child. Piya goes to confess to Ansh, but he doesn't give Piya a chance to speak. Later a heartbroken Piya returns to her home to stay with Guru Maa.

Six years later

Ansh and Piya live separately with Adi (Diaan Talaviya) and Pari (Kisha Arora), the latter possesses daayan powers. Mohana conjures a monster called Bhasmika (Sana Amin Sheikh) who has the powers of all the evil entities. Mohana names the monster Urvashi, who enters the Rathod household to marry Ansh. Adi sees through the true form of Urvashi but is bullied anyway.

Piya brings Pari to Mumbai for her studies. Adi and Pari become friends at school. Once they realise they are siblings, both try to make their parents reconcile. Urvashi constantly attempts to kill Adi as he is a major hindrance between her and Ansh. During the Ganesh Chaturthi celebrations, Urvashi, in an attempt to kidnap Adi, kidnaps Pari by mistake. Piya returns to the Rathod household after six years and demands the release of her daughter. The Rathod family learns that Pari is Piya and Ansh's daughter. The Rathods capture Mohana in the same temple at Bandap. Adi reveals Urvashi's true form and gets kidnapped with Pari on an island. Ansh and Piya regain their powers and with the help of their children they defeat Urvashi and return to the Rathod house.

The Rathod family wants Ansh and Piya to reunite, but Piya is reluctant due to Ansh's mistrust, her six-year separation from Adi, and being abandoned during her pregnancy. Meanwhile, the ghost of Bhasmika rises from the ashes and possesses Piya to get intimate with Ansh. Ansh realises this and stabs her with the daivik dagger. Bhasmika successfully gets her deeds done, creates a pearl and leaves while Piya's soul ascends to Namah Lohk. Shiva and Narayan invite her to ascend to heaven but her soul is reluctant. Ansh sacrifices himself, reaches Namah Lok where his love is tested by the Gods, and retrieves Piya's soul. Ansh and Piya reunite and the family celebrates with the occasion of Pari and Vedashree's birthday which fall on the same day.

Mohana returns to her daayan form after sucking all the life force out of Bhasmika and acquires Bhasmika's powers. Nishant, Naman, and Saavi realise the pearl has grown into an egg. When Nishant and Saavi went to Pari and Vedishri's birthday party, Naman looks after the egg. Then Naman flashed the light on the egg and then the egg flys away. Naman jumps up to catch it but burns his hands and becomes deaf. Pari falls under Mohana's spell and helps her come out of captivity using the evil powers of the egg. Mohana whisks the egg off to its right place to hatch. Out of the egg comes the first Ekayaan of the world, known as Prathmayan/Prathima (Salina Prakash), who is the birth mother of Vedashree, Mohana and Dola. She is the source of all evil entities in the world. Her primary goal is to turn her younger daughter Vedashree into an Ekaayan instead of her elder daughter Mohana, as the latter's shrewd and extremely cunning nature pose a danger for her. To achieve her motive, she wants to defeat the good represented by Goddess Durga with the evil at Dussehra. Pratima, Mohana and Pari start forming an evil army of human beings with the help of Prathmayan mantra, Naman, too, comes under Prathmayan's spell. Nishant prepares a potion that prevents them from falling under the spell of the prathmayan mantra. Naman and Pari break out of the spell and join their family to fight Prathmayan. Piya uses divine energy to invoke Goddess Durga's blessings and powers to kill Prathmayan using a Rama Setu arrow which they created with the help of information written in Divya's diary.

After Prathmayan's departure, Piya is unable to fix her daivik dagger. She immerses it in water where the dagger is refixed by another Daivik Dev (Stavan Shinde). Dev reaches the Rathod House during the anniversary celebrations of Ansh and Piya disguised as Ruchi (Piya's cousin)'s fiancé. Dev wants to win Piya at any cost and he implants a Daivik raksha dravya on Piya's body to prohibit intimacy between Ansh and Piya. On the day of Karva Chauth Dev attacks Ansh and leaves him for dead. He hypnotises all the family members to allow him to marry Piya in order to save Ansh. Mohana saves Ansh and helps him to save Piya. Dev eventually abducts Piya and forcefully ties his Kalasutra around her neck to enslave her. Piya outsmarts him and turns him into an ice statue. Ansh and Piya return home safely with their children on Diwali. Mohana get an opportunity to re-enter the Rathod's house as a return of her favours for helping Ansh and saving Piya.

During the Diwali celebrations, Chaitali goes to the new neighbour's house to greet them. She learns that the new neighbour is in fact Vedashree's twin sister and a daayan, Kalashree (Ritu Chaudhary). Her motive is to unite with Vedashree to become a daayanjod, or a mahadaayan. Mohana constantly tries to warn the Rathods regarding the presence of a daayan in the neighbourhood, but her warnings are dismissed and she is imprisoned in a patal ketki dome. As Vedashree refuses to agree to Kalashree's demands, the latter targets the Rathod family and locks them into a daayan mirror. Everyone but expect Adi and Pari are locked inside the daayan mirror and Vedashree learns of her twin sister's actions. With the help of Daayan gem obtained from Mohana Adi Pari and Nishant brings the family back from the mirror. Vedashree, who had agreed to Kalashree's demands in her helplessness turns into ash. Mohana cautions the Rathod family about the dangers of the ash and demands that they dispose of it. The Rathods disagree in the hopes of bringing back Vedashree to life. Meanwhile, Naman becomes a chudail and faces much trouble to continue as a Reevavanshi. Saavi gives him the task to capture an evil power in order to continue being a Reevavanshi. Dilruba misreads the Naman and believes that Naman is in love with Saavi.

Nishant discovers that Kalashree needs Prathmaayan's vow to become a mahadaayan, which is sent to her through the latter's hair. Piya, with the help of Mohana stops mahadaayan from being born. Mohana helps the Rathods in reviving Vedashree. In return, Mohana demands the Rathods support her in her alliance with Angad (Malhar Pandya) whom she fell in love with, unaware of his true identity. Angad is a Singha (a creature who is the sworn enemy of supernatural entities). Mohana loves Angad deeply and becomes a good person. Ansh on learning Angad's intentions, kills him on the day of her wedding to protect Mohana and his family. Mohana is traumatized after Angad's loss which makes her return to the dark side and swears to take revenge on Ansh.
Mohana forgets all that she had promised herself when she had been in love, as her heart fills with hatred and turns vengeful. Ansh submits himself in front of Mohana so that his family is protected from Mohana's vengeance. Nevertheless, Mohana outsmarts him and transfers Pari's life force into a Praan-Pyaala. Ansh and Piya manage to save Pari through the help of Dilruba who sacrifices herself after giving birth to Dafli (Naman and Dilruba's daughter). However, Mohana had already mixed her blood into Pari's Praan-Pyaala which allows her to live inside Pari.

Mohana executes her revenge in the Rathod house and manages to hurt Vedashree and frame Piya. Piya gets arrested by a CBI officer named Abhay. On the other side, Naman is amazed to discover the supernatural powers of his newborn daughter. Ansh saves Piya from jail and holds a Christmas party in house and tells Abhay the truth. Barkha (Mohana's lookalike) enters and shocks everyone. Nishant learns that Mohana wants to drink a potion "2 Chaand raat Ras", which is available only during a night with two moons. The Rathods and Reewawanshis trusts Barkha and set a trap for Mohana but the latter kills Abhay and Barkha in the process and escapes with the potion. Mohana tricks Ansh into drinking the potion which makes Ansh, the King of Evil Powers, who becomes evil than ever before. Piya's long lost brother, Ayush (also known as Adrishi) appears. With the help of Adrishi, Piya successfully brings Ansh back to his senses, however the potion enters into Ayush, making him evil. Mohana and Ayush team up to put an end to Rathods. They plan to send Rathods to the moon, but Ayush returns to his senses and realises Mohana's intentions. Ayush forcefully takes Mohana to the moon with him. Mohana escapes from Ayush but loses her mental stability. Piya turns into a Visharika(daayan with plant powers) . The Rathods take advantage of her loss of powers to cure Piya, but Mohana regains her powers and learns about a future of her death by the hands of Ansh. She tricks Piya into promising to help kill her murderer, who is Ansh, in exchange to leave their lives forever.

In the end she finally reveals that it was Ansh who would be her murderer. Ansh jumps into lava created by Mohana to save Piya from Mohana's trap but she follows him. Just as Mohana is crowned queen of the witches, Ansh and Piya rise from the dead, and Ansh kills Mohana for good. Finally all members of the family reunite happily.

Season 2 
Palak, a kind woman with a hole in her heart, is forced to marry Apurv, a man whose mental unstable and has a mental age of 5 in exchange for money which she needs to pay for her sister, Naina's hospital fees. They soon fall in love. Madhulika, Apurv's sister is a witch. She plans to sacrifice Apurv on the Purnima night in order to become an Ekayan. She kills everyone who finds out the truth about her. So far, she has stopped Apurv from her getting married, but because Palak is a daivik, her attempts are futile losing her powers in the process. After failing many times, Madhu sends Girgit Behrupi to kill Palak. Palak manages to defeat Behrupi after realizing her daivik powers. The Story ends with an cliffhanger

Cast

Season 1

Main

Monalisa as Mohana Mehta Rathod: Most powerful Daayan; Pratima's daughter; Dola's sister; Vedashree and Kalashree's half-sister; Mridul's wife; Ansh, Karan and Kajal's mother (2018–2020)
Niyati Fatnani as Piya Sharma Rathod: Daivik; Divya and Nishant's daughter; Ayush and Saavi's sister; Ansh's second wife; Aditya and Pari's mother (2018–2020) 
Harsh Rajput as 
Ansh Rathod: Daavansh; Mohana and Mridul's son; Vedashree and Shekhar's nephew ; Karan and Kajal's brother; Rishi, Neha, Tara and Koyal's cousin; Ruby's ex-husband and Piya's husband; Aditya and Pari's father (2018–2020)
Karan Rathod: Mohana and Mridul's son; Ansh and Kajal's brother; Rishi, Neha, Tara and Koyal's cousin; Mansi's husband; Krish's father (2019)

Recurring

Ritu Chaudhary as Vedashree Kulkarni Rathod: Pratima's daughter; Kalashree's sister; Mohana and Dola's half-sister; Divya's friend; Shekhar's wife; Ansh and Kajal's adoptive mother (2018–2020)/Kalashree Kulkarni: Pratima's daughter; Vedashree's sister; Mohana and Dola's half-sister (2019)
 Sumit Kaul as Professor Nishant Sharma: Reevavanshi (Monster Hunter); Trishila's brother; Divya's husband; Piya, Ayush and Saavi's father (2018–2020)
 Smita Bansal as Divya Sharma: Sarpika;  Vedashree's friend; Nishant's wife; Piya, Ayush and Saavi's mother (2018-2019)
 Amit Kaushik as Shekhar Rathod: Mridul, Jaya and Avinash's brother; Vedashree's husband; Ansh and Kajal's adoptive father (2018–2020)
 Ashita Dhawan as Chaitali Rathod: Avinash's wife; Rishi and Neha's mother (2018–2020)
 Kapil Soni as ACP Avinash Rathod: Shekhar, Mridul and Jaya's brother; Chaitali's husband; Rishi and Neha's father (2018–2020)
 Aamir S Khan as Naman Kabra: Gurumaa's son; Piya's ex-fiancé; Sanam's husband; Dafli's father (2018–2020)
 Sreejita De as 
Dilruba: Chudail (2018–2020)
Sanam Kabra: Mayank's ex-fiancé; Naman's wife; Dafli's mother (2019)
 Simran Budharup as Saavi Sharma: Divya and Nishant's daughter; Piya and Ayush's sister (2018–2020)
 Sumit Bhardwaj as Mayank Sachdev: Asuransh; Panna's adopted son; Tamra and Neelam's adoptive brother; Tara's husband (2019)
 Jigyasa Singh as Tara  Sachdev: Jaya and Sudhir's daughter; Koyal's sister; Ansh, Karan, Kajal, Rishi and Neha's cousin; Mayank's wife (2019)
 Sonyaa Ayodhya as Ruby: Chalayaan - A Daayan who can create illusions; Bhaisasur's daughter; Dola's adoptive daughter; Ansh's first wife (2018–2019)
 Diaan Talaviya as Aditya Rathod: Daivik and Daavansh; Piya and Ansh's son; Pari's brother (2019–2020)
 Kiara Bhanushali as Baby Aditya "Munna" Rathod (2019)
 Kisha Arora as Pari Rathod: Daayan; Piya and Ansh's daughter; Aditya's sister (2019–2020)
 Jatin Bhardwaj as Rishi Rathod: Chaitali and Avinash's son; Neha's brother; Ansh, Karan, Kajal, Tara and Koyal's cousin (2018–2019)
 Resham Prashant as Neha Rathod: Chaitali and Avinash's daughter; Rishi's sister; Ansh, Karan, Kajal, Tara and Koyal's cousin (2018–2019)
 Pallavi Gupta as Kajal Rathod: Mohana and Mridul's daughter; Ansh and Karan's sister; Rishi, Neha, Tara and Koyal's cousin (2018–2019)
 Amardeep Jha as Jayanti "Gurumaa" Kabra: Priestess; Naman's mother (2018–2019)
 Priya Malik as Dola Mehta: Two-headed Daayan; Pratima's daughter; Mohana's sister; Vedashree and Kalashree's half-sister; Ruby's adoptive mother (2019)
 Malhar Pandya as Angad (2019)
 Stavan Shinde as Dev (2019)
 Salina Prakash as Pratima Kulkarni/Pratimaayan: First Ekaayan; Mohana, Vedashree, Kalashree and Dola's mother (2019)
 Sana Amin Sheikh as Urvashi/Bhasmika (2019)
 Garima Vikrant Singh as Panna Sachdev: Rakshasa; Tamra and Neelam's mother; Mayank's adoptive mother (2019)
 Isha Sharma as Trishila Sharma: Reevavanshi; Nishant's sister, who has powers to bring the dead alive (2019) 
 Sabina Jat as Tamra Sachdev: Panna's daughter; Neelam's sister; Mayank's adoptive sister; Saavi's colleague (2019)
 Shalini Arora as Jaya Rathod Khanna: Shekhar, Mridul and Avinash's sister; Sudhir's wife; Tara and Koyal's mother (2019)
 Gouri Agarwal as Koyal Khanna: Jaya's daughter, Tara's sister; Ansh, Karan, Kajal, Rishi and Neha's cousin (2019)
 Narayani Shastri as Devika (2019)
 Sikandar Kharbanda as Rudra Pratap Singh: Military officer (2019)
 Vishnu Sharma as Tej Singh– Rathod family's priest; an acquaintance of Nishant and Gurumaa (2018–2020)
 Kushagre Dua as Snake Survansh (2019)
 Ritu Shivpuri as Shalaka: Shardul's mother (2019)
 Kingkini Bhattacharya as Mansi Rathod: Daayan; Karan's wife; Krish's mother; Mohana's helper (2019)
 Moni Rai as Abhiraj: Mohana's victim (2018)
Unknown as Ayush Sharma (Adrishi): Divya and Nishant's son; Piya and Saavi's brother (2020)
 Ankur Nayyar as Mridul Rathod: Shekhar, Jaya and Avinash's brother; Mohana's husband; Ansh, Karan and Kajal's father (2018)

Season 2

Main
 Monalisa as Madhulika Chaudhary: Daayan; Urvashi and Dev's daughter; Apurv, Hema and Malini's sister (2020)
 Shruti Sharma as Daivik Palak Verma Chaudhary: Naina's sister; Apurv's wife (2020)
 Sheezan Mohammed as Apurv Singh Chaudhary: Daavansh; Urvashi and Dev's son; Madhulika, Hema and Malini's brother; Palak's husband (2020)

Recurring
 Nisha Nagpal as Vishala: Daayan; Madhulika's sworn enemy
 Anjali Gupta as Urvashi Chaudhary: Dev's wife; Madhulika, Hema, Malini and Apurv's mother
 Monal Jagtani as Hema Chaudhary: Urvashi and Dev's daughter; Madhulika, Malini and Apurv's sister 
 Reema Vohra as Malini Chaudhary: Urvashi and Dev's daughter; Madhulika, Hema and Apurv's sister 
 Gargi Patel/Alka Kaushal as Narmada Chaudhary: Dev's mother; Madhulika, Apurv, Hema and Malini's grandmother 
 Abhay Shankar Jha as Borath Nath: Chaudhary family's priest
 Vishnu Sharma as Gurudev
 Bhakti Narula as Sarita Parekh: Chaudhary family's maid; Randeep's wife 
 Raju Shrestha as Randeep Parekh: Palak and Naina's mother's brother; Sarita's husband 
 Tammana Mannan as Naina Verma: Palak's sister
 Nikhil Mehta as Chameleon Girgit Behrupi

Production
This series was originally planned for 100 episodes, but the positive response to the series extended its run. In August 2019, the storyline of the series took a leap of six years.

In the first week of February 2020, producer Gul Khan confirmed the end of season 1 and production of season 2 of the series. On 14 February 2020, the teaser of season 2 was released featuring Mona Lisa. Later, the promo featuring Mona Lisa and Sheezan Mohammad was released.

Due to COVID-19 outbreak, on 19 March 2020 the shootings were stalled until 31 March 2020 before lockdown was announced. However, on 25 March 2020 lockdown was announced for 21 days then was extended till 3 May and again extended and the shootings could not resume after it. On 20 March 2020, the series was halted airing and was supposed to return after lockdown. But, as the lockdown was extended longer than expected and shootings were stalled indefinitely. In May 2020 the series' cancellation was confirmed. It was due to the high budget of the series causing losses. On 10 October 2021, The series came back as a telefilm with a new plot and twists under the title Ankahee Daastaan-Nazar which was telecasted on 10 October 2021.

Reception

Critical response

India Today stated, "Although there is no dearth of chudails, dayans and shaitans in Indian TV, Gul's dayan stands apart. The character is loud and over the top, but is well-written and has a fascinating back story. Mona Lisa as Mohona is impressive, and the show is able to hold the interest of the viewer despite being a daily."

After its premiere, it received negative criticism from The Times of India which stated, "Right from the beginning to the end, the show fails to hold you as it is highly dramatic, and the background music adds to the woes. The railway station, the forest and the havelis are typical elements used in a supernatural thriller. They bring no novelty. The plot is incoherent as the background of the characters is not explained well. The show is painfully slow, the story is patchy and so are the scenes. Dialogues are retro and filmy. The list can go on. Monalisa and Harsh Rajput disappoint as actors. They play their parts with zero efficiency. The supporting cast is again average at its best."

However, speaking about the success of the series, The Times of India stated, "The majority of the scenes are shot using chroma and the makers add special effects that add to the quality of the episodes. The makers have made a make-believe world with Mohana's story and it's quite an enchanting and exciting one just like your dadima's childhood 'evil vs good' stories".

Ratings
The first season opened to a TRP of 1.8 and 4.2 million impressions featuring in top 20 shows.

Soundtrack

Nazar's soundtrack is written by Divy Nidhi Sharma and composed by Sanjeev Srivastava. Tapas Relia composed the background score for the show. "Saajna", the theme song of the first season was performed by Bhaven Dhanak and Pamela Jain. "Janiya" was also sung by Bhaven Dhanak and Pamela Jain, and was used for the second season.

Adaptations

Crossover
In 2019, Nazar and Divya Drishti had a collaboration where Antara Biswas (Mohana) entered Divya Drishti and partnered with Sangita Ghosh (Pishachini).

See also
 List of Hindi supernatural shows
 List of programmes broadcast by StarPlus

References

External links
 
 

Indian fantasy television series
2018 Indian television series debuts
Hindi-language television shows
Indian drama television series
StarPlus original programming
Television shows set in Mumbai
Television series by 4 Lions Films
Indian horror fiction television series
Indian supernatural television series